Politics of memory is the organisation of collective memory by political agents; the political means by which events are remembered and recorded, or discarded. Eventually, politics of memory may determine the way history is written and passed on, hence the terms history politics or politics of history. The politics of history is the effects of political influence on the representation or study of historical topics, commonly associated with the totalitarian state which use propaganda and other means to impose a specific version of history with the goal of eliminating competing perspectives about the past. In order to achieve this goal, memory regimes resort to different means such as narrating (the construction of a seemingly coherent narrative), strategic silencing (the masking-out of historical facts that contradict one's own interpretation), performing (ritualized forms of reifying the narrative) or renaming/remapping (inscribing the narrative into the monumental and toponymic landscape). 

Nevertheless, the term is contested and there is no common agreement on its meaning which is often a matter of contextual use.

Memories are also influenced by cultural forces, e.g. popular culture, as well as social norms. It has also been connected with the construction of identity.

By country

Australia

Armenia and Turkey
Armenia and Turkey maintain strongly divergent official narratives on the events of 1915, known as the Armenian Genocide. While Armenian official historiography sees in it a deliberate attempt to irrevocably cleanse the Eastern provinces of the Ottoman Empire of its indigenous Armenian populations that stands in continuity of a longer history of Anti-Armenian pogroms, Turkish official historiography denies the extent of state violence and sees in the events of 1915 merely a resettlement campaign (tehcir) provoked by hostilities of Armenian nationalist organizations backed by Tsarist Russia. In contrast to Turkish official historiography, the Kurdish political movement within Turkey widely recognizes the events as a genocide, though marginalizing the role of Kurdish complicity in the killings.

Cyprus
The two sides in the conflict in Cyprus maintain widely divergent and contrasting memories of the events that split the island. The term selective memory is applied by psychologists to people suffering from head injuries who retain some memories, but have amnesia about others. Societal trauma, such as war, seems to have a similar effect. Recollections that are shaped out of a phenomenon common to many countries traumatized by war and repression, may be remembered in radically different ways by people who experienced similar events.

The selectivity may also serve a political purpose, for example to justify the claims of one group over a competing group. Cyprus is a poignant case for this phenomenon. The longstanding conflict on the island reflects deep roots in the "motherlands" of the Greek Cypriot and Turkish Cypriot peoples.

Germany
In Germany, the term "politics of history"/"history politics" (Geschichtspolitik) was propounded by German Chancellor Helmut Kohl in late 1980s during the Historikerstreit discussion on how to memorialise the Nazi Germany and World War II.

Speeches by politicians often deal with issues of how to memorialize the past. Richard von Weizsäcker as Bundespräsident identified two modes of memorializing the unconditional surrender of Nazi Germany in 1945 in his famous 1985 speech: this date can be seen as defeat or liberation. Weizsäcker backed the latter interpretation. In this regard, such moments as the first official "Day of Commemoration for Victims of National Socialism", on January 20, 1996, led to Bundespräsident Roman Herzog remarking in his address to the German Parliament that "Remembrance gives us strength, since it helps to keep us from going astray." In similar, but somewhat opposing measure, Gerhard Schröder sought to move beyond this in saying the generation that committed such deeds has passed, and a new generation does not have the same fault because they simply weren't there to be responsible. 

Good examples for politics of memory could be seen in national monuments and the discourses surrounding their construction. The construction of a Holocaust memorial in memory of the murdered Jews of Europe at a central location in Berlin was met with protests but also with strong support. Likewise the National Memorial to the Victims of War and Tyranny was deemed inappropriate by some onlookers and a discussion revolved around the question whether the lack of a differentiation between victims and perpetrators is adequate or not.

The question if and how to memorise Germans expelled from Poland in the aftermath of World War II has been constantly debated in both West Germany and Poland. Such questions are so difficult because it requires a moral judgement of these events. These judgements differ remarkably. For instance, the Federation of German Expellees called on Poland to pay compensation for lost property to Germans from what after 1945 became Polish territory, a claim that is consistently declined by Poland. 

Similarly there have been debates in Germany whether the legacy of World War II implies that Germany's military should be confined to purely defensive measure like peacekeeping or, contrary to this, this legacy can be a justification of an active enforcement of human rights which also might involve preemptive strikes.

Poland

In Poland, the issue of history politics have risen to the state level when in 2015 it was announced that the works had started on the "Strategy of Polish Political Policy" ("Strategia Polskiej Polityki Historycznej"). President Andrzej Duda announced that "carrying out the historical policy is one of the most important activities of the president".

Russia
The history in Russia has been highly politicized since the times of the Soviet Union. in the 2000s Vladimir Putin's regime undertook a new revision of history under the pretext of the defense of the national past against the alleged slanderers. As a first step of this defense was the establishment of the commission to handle "the attempts to falsify history to the detriment of Russia’s interests" in May 2009. 

The central topic of the new "history politics" has become World War II.

The 2018 book of Mariëlle Wijermars Memory Politics in Contemporary Russia Television, Cinema and the State analyses the effects of various actors, such as the government, the Russian Orthodox Church, cultural figures, and radical thinkers, such as Aleksandr Dugin, on Russian memory politics, and its usage in legitimizing the government and discrediting the opposition.

Ukraine
According to historian Georgiy Kasianov, the Ukrainian Institute of National Memory from 2015 was under control of Ukrainian nationalist forces.

Yugoslavia
Croatian researcher Snježana Koren analyzed the history politics in Yugoslavia by analyzing teaching of history at school during 1945-1960, an immediate aftermath of World War II. She traced both internal and external influences on the state's politics of history, in particular how it was affected by the affiliation with the Soviet Union and the subsequent Soviet-Yugoslav split. She also analyzed the differences in the narratives in different Yugoslav republics.

Monuments

Spatial markers of memory such as monuments play a crucial role in inscribing a historical narrative into the landscape, an act described by Herfried Münkler as the monumentalization of the landscape.  When successor states inherit the monumental landscape of the ancien régime often heated debates errupt on the fate of such monuments. New regimes of memory may neglect, appropriate or physically remove monuments. However, their removals may be controversial: in Estonia the removal of a Soviet era statue from the capital evoked strong reaction from Russia.

Efficacy and moral relativity

W. G. Sebald underlines German amnesia surrounding the Allied carpet bombings of 131 German cities and towns which turned many German cities into vast necropolises, and resulted in an estimated 600,000 primarily civilian deaths, with millions of internal refugees.

In literature
Milan Kundera's opening story in the Book of Laughter and Forgetting is about a Slovak official posing with other officials for a photograph in winter. The man gives his fur hat to cover his superior's bald head and the photo is taken. Later, when he falls out of favour and is denounced and removed from official records and documents, he is even air-brushed out of photographs; all that remains of him is his fur hat.

Winston Churchill is purported to have said that "history is written by the victors." The accuracy and significance of this statement is still debated.

Raul Hilberg's autobiography is titled The politics of memory.

See also
 Censorship
 Damnatio memoriae
 Historical negationism
 Invented tradition
 Memory laws
 Nationalism
 Official history
 Politics of identity
 Social amnesia
 The Use and Abuse of History, Or, How the Past is Taught

References

Further reading
The Politics of History in Comparative Perspective, special edition of The Annals of the American Academy of Political and Social Science

Memory